African Venus is an album by American jazz saxophonist Dewey Redman featuring his son Joshua Redman. It was recorded in 1992 and released on the Evidence label.

Reception
The Allmusic review by Al Campbell awarded the album 3 stars stating "Not an essential disc, but far from a throwaway".

Track listing
All compositions by Dewey Redman except as indicated
 "African Venus" – 9:27
 "Venus and Mars" – 7:48
 "Mr. Sandman" (Pat Ballard) – 6:54
 "Echo Prayer" – 5:53
 "Satin Doll" (Duke Ellington, Johnny Mercer, Billy Strayhorn) – 8:23
 "Take the "A" Train" (Strayhorn) – 7:41
 "Turnaround" (Ornette Coleman) – 6:25
Recorded at the Sound on Sound Studio in New York City on December 11, 1992

Personnel
Musicians
Dewey Redman – tenor saxophone, alto saxophone, musette
Joshua Redman – tenor saxophone
Charles Eubanks – piano
Anthony Cox – bass
Carl Allen – drums
Danny Sadownick – percussion

Production
Big Apple Productions, Inc. – producer
Tetsuo Hara – executive producer
Peter Beckerman – engineer (recording)
Rothacker Advertising & Design – art direction
John Litweiler – liner notes 
Harrison Hurwitz – photography

References

Evidence Music albums
Dewey Redman albums
1992 albums